Kim Seong-eun is a Korean name consisting of the family name Kim and the given name Seong-eun, and may also refer to:

 Kim Sung-eun (actress, born 1983) (born 1983), South Korean actress
 Kim Seong-eun (athlete) (born 1989), South Korean athlete
 Kim Sung-eun (actress, born 1991) (born 1991), South Korean actress
 Kim Seong-eun (boxer) (born 1943), South Korean boxer
 Kim Seong-eun (field hockey) (born 1976), South Korean hockey player
 Kim Seong-eun (water polo) (born 1967), South Korean water polo player